Robert Crawford Lipsett Jr. (born October 23, 1947) is a violin teacher in Los Angeles, California. He holds the Jascha Heifetz Distinguished Violin Chair at the Colburn School of Performing Arts. He also serves on the faculty at the Aspen School of Music, the Colburn Conservatory and the Colburn Academy.  He has given master classes at major schools around the world.

Lipsett was born in Louisville, Kentucky. He has a younger brother named Stephen James Lipsett, a successful real estate investor/broker living on Lake Granbury, Texas. As a child, he moved with his family to Dallas, Texas, where he began violin study with Zelman Brounoff and Ruth Lasley.  The family subsequently lived in Saint Louis, Missouri, where Lipsett's violin instructor was Melvin Ritter.  He graduated from the Cleveland Institute of Music and later studied with Ivan Galamian at The Juilliard School and with Endre Granat.  He also earned a B.A. in Music from California State University, Northridge.

Lipsett's students have consistently won important competitions including the Julius Stulberg Awards, the Yehudi Menuhin and Irving M. Klein International Violin Competitions, and several have received highest honors from the National Association for the Advancement of the Arts, and been recognized as Presidential Scholars. He is a recipient of the Distinguished Teachers Award from the White House Commission for Presidential Scholars. He is also a freelance commercial musician in motion pictures, television and the recording industry.

Students
Robert Chen, Concertmaster of the Chicago Symphony
Sheryl Staples, Principal Associate Concertmaster of the New York Philharmonic
Steven Copes, Concertmaster of the Saint Paul Chamber Orchestra
Michelle Kim, Assistant Concertmaster of the New York Philharmonic
Tamaki Kawakubo, concert artist
Hahn-Bin, concert artist
Leila Josefowicz, concert artist
Ilana Setapen, Associate Concertmaster of the Milwaukee Symphony Orchestra
Lindsay Deutsch, concert artist 
Jennifer Frautschi, concert artist
Elbert Tsai, San Francisco Ballet and Symphony
Zlata Grekov, concert artist
Ken Hamao, concert artist
Fabiola Kim, assistant professor of violin at the University of Michigan
Samuel Fischer, teacher at the Colburn School of Performing Arts
Kevin Amann, concert artist, (first student)
Elise Goodman 
Rachel Stegeman (Ray Ray), Concertmaster, Wheeling Symphony and Youngstown Symphony; Faculty, Duquesne University
Elizabeth Pitcairn, concert artist and Artistic Director of the Luzerne Music Center
Amy Hershberger, Concertmaster, Santa Barbara Chamber Orchestra; Assistant Concertmaster, Pasadena Symphony
Simone Porter
William Hagen
Sooah Kim
Xika Huang
Blake Pouliot
Mayumi Kanagawa
Aubree Oliverson
Jinan Laurentia Woo
John Fawcett

References

External links
 

American male violinists
California State University, Northridge alumni
Juilliard School alumni
Cleveland Institute of Music alumni
Musicians from Dallas
Classical musicians from Texas
Living people
1947 births
Musicians from Louisville, Kentucky
21st-century American violinists
21st-century American male musicians